Opium is a 1919 German silent film directed by Robert Reinert and starring Eduard von Winterstein, Sybill Morel, and Werner Krauss.

Cast

References

Bibliography

External links

1919 films
Films of the Weimar Republic
Films directed by Robert Reinert
German silent feature films
Films about drugs
German black-and-white films
Films about opium
1910s German films